FC Merani Tbilisi is a Georgian football club based in Tbilisi. They play in the Erovnuli Liga 2, the second division in Georgian football.  They play their home games at Sinatle Stadium.

The club is named after a hotel in Tbilisi. The club colours are all-red for home matches, and all-white for away.

History

Merani Tbilisi was merged with Bacho Tbilisi in July 1993 and formed Merani-Bacho Tbilisi. Later Lokomotivi Tbilisi renamed in 1996

The club second team Merani-91 Tbilisi, became the first team.

In 2002, Merani-91 Tbilisi merged again, this time to FC Olimpi Tbilisi, owned by Nikoloz Dolidze and formed Merani-Olimpi Tbilisi. Which FC Tbilisi take the 2002–03 seat.

Merani restarted in Regionuli Liga by changed the reserve team to first team.

In July 2004, newly formed Merani Tbilisi was merged with Milani Tsnori and formed Merani-Milani Tbilisi, which renamed to Merani Tbilisi in July 2005.

Seasons
1990: ?
1991: Merani Tbilisi Regionuli Liga
1991–92: Merani Tbilisi Pirveli Liga
1992–93: Merani Tbilisi Pirveli Liga
1993–94: Merani-Bacho Tbilisi Pirveli Liga
1994–95: Merani-Bacho Tbilisi Pirveli Liga
2003–04: Merani Tbilisi Regionuli Liga
2004–05: Merani-Milani Tbilisi Pirveli Liga
2005–06: Merani Tbilisi Pirveli Liga Runner-up
2006–07: Merani Tbilisi Umaghlesi Liga
2007–08: Merani Tbilisi Umaghlesi Liga 15th, Relegated
2008–09: Merani Tbilisi Meore Liga

Merani-91
1991: Merani-91 Tbilisi ?
1991–92: Merani-91 Tbilisi ?
1992–93: Merani-91 Tbilisi ?
1993–94: Merani-91 Tbilisi Pirveli Liga
1994–95: Merani-91 Tbilisi Pirveli Liga
1995–96: Merani-91 Tbilisi Pirveli Liga
1996–97: Merani-91 Tbilisi Umaghlesi Liga
1997–98: Merani-91 Tbilisi Umaghlesi Liga
1998–99: Merani-91 Tbilisi Umaghlesi Liga
1999-00: Merani-91 Tbilisi Umaghlesi Liga
2000–01: Merani-91 Tbilisi Umaghlesi Liga
2001–02: Merani-91 Tbilisi Umaghlesi Liga (Second team in Pirveli Liga)
2002–03: Merani-Olimpi Tbilisi Umaghlesi Liga

Current squad 
As of August 2020

Honours
Pirveli Liga
 Champion: 1996
 Silver Medal winner: 1995, 2006

Notable players
 Teymuraz Mchedlishvili

Eurocups record

Coaches
2002: Otar Gabelia
2003: Koba Zhorzhikashvili
2003: Nikoloz Dolidze
2003: Temur Lortkipanidze
2003: Joni Janelidze

References

Merani Tbilisi
Merani Tbilisi
Association football clubs established in 1995
1995 establishments in Georgia (country)